Scrabble School is a historic Rosenwald school for African-American children located near Castleton, Rappahannock County, Virginia. It was built in 1921–1922, and is a one-story, wood-frame building clad in rough-cast stucco siding.  The building sits on a poured concrete foundation.  It features overhanging eaves, a wood cornice, exposed rafter tails, and
decorative corner brackets in the American Craftsman style.  Also on the property are the contributing concrete block coal house/shed (c. 1950) and septic tanks / privy sites (c. 1922).  The school was permanently closed in 1968.

It was added to the National Register of Historic Places in 2007.

References

Rosenwald schools in Virginia
School buildings on the National Register of Historic Places in Virginia
School buildings completed in 1922
Schools in Rappahannock County, Virginia
National Register of Historic Places in Rappahannock County, Virginia
1922 establishments in Virginia